This is a list of years in Yemen.

20th century

21st century

See also
 Timeline of Yemeni history
 Timeline of Aden
 Timeline of Sana'a

 
History of Yemen
Yemen history-related lists
Yemen